Margaret Lorimer (9 June 1866 – 29 October 1954) was a New Zealand school principal and mountaineer. She was born in Inverness, Scotland and moved to Lyttelton, New Zealand with her family in 1874. She attended Christchurch Girls' High School and took the university entrance examination in 1883.

She became headmistress of Mount Cook Girls' School, Wellington in 1897 and was subsequently principal of Nelson College for Girls in 1906, remaining in this role for 19 years.

Margaret Lorimer climbed Mount Moltke in 1912 and continued to have a number of successful climbing seasons in her 50s, ascending Mount Cook – New Zealand's highest mountain – in 1918. She was a member of the New Zealand Alpine Club from 1924, also joining the Ladies' Alpine Club in London.

References

1866 births
1954 deaths
New Zealand mountain climbers
New Zealand schoolteachers
People from Inverness
Scottish emigrants to New Zealand
Nelson College for Girls faculty
Female climbers
People educated at Christchurch Girls' High School